Elvira de Jesús Pola Figueroa (born 27 July 1957) is a Mexican politician from the Party of the Democratic Revolution. In 2012, she was a deputy of the LXI Legislature of the Mexican Congress representing Chiapas.

References

1957 births
Living people
Politicians from Chiapas
Women members of the Chamber of Deputies (Mexico)
Party of the Democratic Revolution politicians
21st-century Mexican politicians
21st-century Mexican women politicians
Deputies of the LXI Legislature of Mexico
Members of the Chamber of Deputies (Mexico) for Chiapas